Ronald Cairns (4 April 1934 – August 2016) was an English professional footballer who played as an inside forward.

Career
Born in Chopwell, Cairns played for Consett, Blackburn Rovers, Rochdale, Southport and Wigan Athletic. He played for Rochdale in the 1962 Football League Cup Final.

References

1934 births
2016 deaths
People from County Durham (before 1974)
Footballers from Tyne and Wear
English footballers
Association football inside forwards
Consett A.F.C. players
Blackburn Rovers F.C. players
Rochdale A.F.C. players
Southport F.C. players
Wigan Athletic F.C. players
English Football League players